Werleys Corner is an unincorporated community in Weisenberg Township in Lehigh County, Pennsylvania. It is part of the Lehigh Valley, which has a population of 861,899 and is the 68th most populated metropolitan area in the U.S. as of the 2020 census.

Notes

Unincorporated communities in Lehigh County, Pennsylvania
Unincorporated communities in Pennsylvania